Filemón Bartolomé Vela (May 1, 1935 – April 13, 2004) was a United States district judge of the United States District Court for the Southern District of Texas.

Education and career

Born in Harlingen, Texas, Vela was a private in the United States Army from 1957 to 1959, and received a Juris Doctor from St. Mary's University School of Law in 1962. He was in private practice in Harlingen from 1962 to 1963, and then in Brownsville, Texas from 1963 to 1974. He was a city commissioner in Brownsville from 1971 to 1973. He was a judge of the 107th Judicial District in Cameron and Willacy Counties, Texas from 1975 to 1980.

Federal judicial service

On January 22, 1980, Vela was nominated by President Jimmy Carter to a seat on the United States District Court for the Southern District of Texas vacated by Judge Reynaldo Guerra Garza. Vela was confirmed by the United States Senate on June 18, 1980, and received his commission the same day. He assumed senior status on May 1, 2000, serving in that capacity until his death on April 13, 2004, in Harlingen.

Vela presided over the capital murder trial of drug lord Juan Raul Garza. Garza was executed by the federal government in 2001, eight days after Timothy McVeigh.

Personal

Vela was married to Blanca Vela, who served as the first female Mayor of Brownsville, Texas, from 1999 to 2003. Their three children include Filemon Vela Jr., who was elected to the United States Congress in 2012.

See also
List of Hispanic/Latino American jurists

References

Sources
 

1935 births
2004 deaths
20th-century American judges
Hispanic and Latino American judges
Judges of the United States District Court for the Southern District of Texas
People from Harlingen, Texas
United States Army soldiers
United States district court judges appointed by Jimmy Carter